Ethiopia competed at the World Games 2017 in Wroclaw, Poland, from 20 July 2017 to 30 July 2017. Ethiopia didn't win any medal in the multi-sport event.

Competitors

Jujitsu 
Ethiopia had qualified one athlete for the multi-sport event.

Yared Nigussen in the men's 64 kg Ne Waza

References 

Nations at the 2017 World Games
2017 in Ethiopian sport
Ethiopia at multi-sport events